John Keegan de Lancie (born October 31, 1984) is an American former actor, the son of actor John de Lancie and Marnie Mosiman. He is known for playing "Q Junior", the son of his father's recurring Star Trek character Q in the 2001 Star Trek: Voyager episode "Q2". He has also appeared in popular television shows such as Ally McBeal and The Drew Carey Show.

In 2011 de Lancie worked for the International Organization for Migration, where he monitored Iraqi Christians seeking refuge through their movements to Iraq's Kurdish regions. In 2014 he became a member of the U.S. Foreign Service.

Filmography

References

External links

1984 births
Living people
21st-century American male actors
American male film actors
American male television actors
Male actors from Los Angeles
People from California
University of North Carolina at Chapel Hill alumni
American diplomats